The Consul General of Peru in Dubai is the official representative of the Republic of Peru to the United Arab Emirates.

The Peruvian consulate-general in Dubai was opened in 2011. The United Arab Emirates have an embassy in Lima, which opened on March 2016, and is accredited to neighbouring Ecuador and Bolivia.

List of representatives

See also
List of ambassadors of Peru to Kuwait
List of ambassadors of Peru to Qatar
List of ambassadors of Peru to Saudi Arabia

References

Lists of diplomats
Dubai
Peru